Each year, the jury of the Berlin International Film Festival is chaired by an internationally recognised personality of cinema. Being appointed to this position is the recognition of an outstanding career. This article lists all past presidents of the international jury, which is responsible for awarding the most prestigious prizes in the festival, including the Golden Bear and various Silver Bears.

History

The winners of the first awards in 1951 were determined by an exclusively West German panel. The FIAPF (Fédération Internationale des Associations de Producteurs de Films) banned the awarding of jury prizes at the festival so between 1952 and 1955, the winners of the Golden Bear were determined by the audience members.

In 1956, FIAPF formally accredited the festival and since then the Golden Bear has been awarded by an international jury. In 2021 a jury presidency was not appointed for the first time since creation of the position. 

The first foreign president of the jury and inaugural holder of this position was French film director Marcel Carné. The first woman who held the office of president of the jury was dancer Wendy Toye.

Since creation, no one has been appointed as president of the jury more than once.

Main competition jury presidents

See also
 List of Cannes Film Festival jury presidents
 List of Venice Film Festival jury presidents

Footnotes

References

External links 
 

Berlin International Film Festival